Chickering Hall (1901–1912) was an auditorium in Boston, Massachusetts, located on Huntington Avenue in the Back Bay. It stood adjacent to Horticultural Hall. Tenants included the Emerson College of Oratory and D.M. Shooshan's "Ladies' and Gents' Cafe." In 1912 it became the St. James Theatre, and later the Uptown Theatre. The building existed until 1963, when it was demolished.

Performances
 Opening concert, with Antoinette Szumowska, Pol Plançon, Kneisel Quartet
 Lucy Gates, soprano
 Florizel, boy violinist
 Ossip Gabrilowitsch, pianist
 The Merchant of Venice, with Ben Greet English Co.
 W. B. Yeats plays, with Margaret Wycherly
 Beatrice Herford

Images

See also
 Chickering Hall, Boston (1883)
 Chickering and Sons

References

External links

 Historic New England owns materials related to Chickering Hall
 Boston Public Library. Photo of Chickering Hall, Huntington Ave., 1911
 Bostonian Society. 
 Photograph of street-level view south of Symphony Hall, located at 240 Huntington Avenue, and Horticultural and Chickering Halls, located at 239 Huntington Avenue. Trolley bus tracks run in front of buildings.
 CinemaTreasures.org. Uptown Theatre, 239 Huntington Avenue, Boston, MA 02115 (successor to the St. James)

Music venues completed in 1901
Demolished buildings and structures in Boston
Event venues established in 1901
Cultural history of Boston
20th century in Boston
Back Bay, Boston
Buildings and structures demolished in 1963